Xerophaeus is a genus of ground spiders that was first described by William Frederick Purcell in 1907.

Species
 it contains forty-one species and one subspecies:
Xerophaeus ahenus Purcell, 1908 – South Africa
Xerophaeus anthropoides Hewitt, 1916 – South Africa
Xerophaeus appendiculatus Purcell, 1907 – South Africa
Xerophaeus aridus Purcell, 1907 – Namibia, South Africa
Xerophaeus aurariarum Purcell, 1907 – South Africa
Xerophaeus bicavus Tucker, 1923 – South Africa
Xerophaeus biplagiatus Tullgren, 1910 – East AFrica
Xerophaeus capensis Purcell, 1907 (type) – South Africa
Xerophaeus communis Purcell, 1907 – South Africa
Xerophaeus coruscus (L. Koch, 1875) – Ethiopia, East Africa, Yemen
Xerophaeus c. kibonotensis Tullgren, 1910 – East, South Africa
Xerophaeus crusculus Tucker, 1923 – South Africa
Xerophaeus crustosus Purcell, 1907 – South Africa
Xerophaeus druryi Tucker, 1923 – South Africa
Xerophaeus espoir Platnick, 1981 – Seychelles
Xerophaeus exiguus Purcell, 1907 – South Africa
Xerophaeus flammeus Tucker, 1923 – South Africa
Xerophaeus flavescens Purcell, 1907 – South Africa
Xerophaeus hottentottus Purcell, 1908 – South Africa
Xerophaeus kiwuensis Strand, 1913 – Central Africa
Xerophaeus lightfooti Purcell, 1907 – South Africa
Xerophaeus longispina Purcell, 1908 – South Africa
Xerophaeus lunulifer Purcell, 1907 – South Africa
Xerophaeus maritimus Lawrence, 1938 – South Africa
Xerophaeus matroosbergensis Tucker, 1923 – South Africa
Xerophaeus occiduus Tucker, 1923 – South Africa
Xerophaeus oceanicus Schmidt & Jocqué, 1983 – Réunion
Xerophaeus pallidus Tucker, 1923 – South Africa
Xerophaeus patricki Purcell, 1907 – South Africa
Xerophaeus perversus Purcell, 1923 – South Africa
Xerophaeus phaseolus Tucker, 1923 – South Africa
Xerophaeus robustus Lawrence, 1936 – South Africa
Xerophaeus rostratus Purcell, 1907 – South Africa
Xerophaeus ruandanus Strand, 1913 – Rwanda
Xerophaeus rubeus Tucker, 1923 – South Africa
Xerophaeus silvaticus Tucker, 1923 – South Africa
Xerophaeus spiralifer Purcell, 1907 – South Africa
Xerophaeus spoliator Purcell, 1907 – South Africa
Xerophaeus tenebrosus Tucker, 1923 – South Africa
Xerophaeus thomasi (Caporiacco, 1949) – Kenya
Xerophaeus vickermani Tucker, 1923 – South Africa
Xerophaeus zuluensis Lawrence, 1938 – South Africa

References

Araneomorphae genera
Gnaphosidae
Spiders of Africa
Spiders of Asia
Taxa named by William Frederick Purcell